Duba is a small city on the northern Red Sea coast, of Saudi Arabia. It is in Tabuk Province. Local citizens describe it as The Pearl of the Red Sea. The population of Duba is about 22,000.

History
The first reference to Duba, under this name, is from 1203. However, the Valley of Salma and Valley of Kafafah were already known many centuries before.

The ancient Greek scholar Ptolemy mentioned  a trade route leading from Kafafah to Lihyan (today's Al-`Ula). Sheikh Abd al-Ghani al-Nabulsi wrote about Duba in 1790, in his account of going to Mecca for the Hajj.

Historically it is part of Madian; the city is mentioned in Islamic scriptures. According to the Quran, Prophet Moussa settled in Madian (the region starts from Jordan river and extends to the town of Duba). The town of Prophet Shoaib as it is called is said to be located near Maqna where an ancient well can still be seen. The well is said to be the one where Moussa fed the flock.

The Ottoman Turks fortified the city, protecting the route from Egypt to Arabia.

The Arab Revolt had taken control of Duba from the Ottomans by mid-1917.

After the Saudi conquest of the city in 1933, King Abdulaziz built his castle there in the same year.

Geography
Duba is located in the northwest of Saudi Arabia on the coast of the Red Sea on the Egyptian road of the Hajj, about 300 km from the intersection of Egypt, Jordan and Israel.  Duba includes 3 valleys, Dahkan to the north, and Salma and Kafafah on the south. It is about 800 km from Jeddah / Mecca via the coastal highway that passes through the major port and industrial city of Yanbu.

Duba is a port city and ferries and ships operate from here for Egypt and Jordan. The Hurghada and Safaga ports of Egypt can be reached within about 3 hours (minimum) by ferry. It is strategically located at the starting point of Gulf of Aqaba that ends at Eilat (Israel) and Aqaba, Jordan.
It is one of the most important economic epicenter for its own country, each year there are a lot of merchants who pass Duba City.

The Springs of Maqna are an interesting picnic spot and there are notable beaches such as Sharma Beach, though it is not developed as a tourist spot.

The City is also serving as hub for Neom.

Climate
Köppen-Geiger climate classification system classifies its climate as hot desert (BWh).

Transportation
There is no local public transport within the city. Most of the city is within walking range. Rental car facilities are present for day trips (or even more for nearby attractions). Some individuals do operate their cars as private taxis but they are difficult to trace. Ride-hailing apps such as Uber and Careem do not operate in Duba however, a similar but lesser known app called Kaiian has a few drivers who operate on a cash-only basis. 

The neighboring cities Tabuk (180 km) and Al Wajh (about 160 km) have airport facilities that connect the region with major national and international airports of the kingdom of Saudi Arabia.

Saptco Saudi Road Transport offers bus services from Jeddah and Mecca to Tabuk, Saudi Arabia via Duba. It takes about 12 hours to reach Duba from Jeddah.

Food

Numerous restaurants are around the city which serve you Arabic, Pakistani, Indian food in the surroundings other than restaurant chains such as Dunkin donuts, etc are available.

In Art and Literature
Duba is the subject of a painting by Samuel Austin, an engraving of which was published in Fisher's Drawing Room Scrap Book, 1833 as  along with a poetical illustration by Letitia Elizabeth Landon that recalls the story of the Fairy Pari-Banou and Prince Ahmed.

See also 

 List of cities and towns in Saudi Arabia

Video

City of Duba

External links
Official site

References 

 http://wikimapia.org/9912900/Duba-Port

Populated places in Tabuk Province